Have It All is an unreleased studio album by Jesse McCartney. The album was originally intended to be released on December 28, 2010, by Hollywood Records as McCartney's fourth studio album.

Background
On August 16, 2010, McCartney announced the release of "Shake", the first single from his upcoming fourth studio album, would be released after Labor Day. "Shake" was sent to radio on September 8, 2010 and was released digitally on September 21, 2010. The song peaked at number 54 on the Hot 100. On October 18, 2010, it was announced that Have It All would be released in January 2011. On November 30, it was announced that the album release would be pushed up to December 28, 2010, the Tuesday following Christmas. On December 3, 2010, McCartney announced through his Facebook page that he had pushed the release date for the album back to early 2011.

On April 7, 2011, McCartney responded to a question on his Twitter page about the delay, saying "The Release of Have It All has been put on hold until we hear about the outcome of Locke & Key", the television series in which he had a lead role. On November 3, McCartney said via his WhoSay page "2012 is still the magic year for the record to finally come out." On May 6, 2012, McCartney's mother said on Twitter that the replacement of the President of his label, Hollywood Records in January 2012 is delaying the release of his album.

In the March 2013 issue of Glamouholic magazine, an exclusive interview was conducted and he confirmed the release of his anticipated fourth studio album, after all the disbandments of his record label, within this year. Have It All, however, would go on to never be officially released. Limited quantities of the album were pressed and are occasionally available from online sources such as eBay.

Track listing
Track listing, writing and production credits adapted from album liner notes.

Personnel
Katisse Buckingham – alto saxophone, tenor saxophone
James Casey – tenor saxophone
The Elev3n –  drum programming
Juliet Haffner – viola
Robbie Kondor – piano, string arrangements
Jesse McCartney – lead vocals, background vocals
James G. Morales – drums, percussion
Matt Morales – horn arrangements, trumpet
Troy "R8DIO" Johnson – drum programming, keyboards, synthesizer
Amy Ralske – cello
Julio David Rodriguez – bass guitar, acoustic guitar, electric guitar

References 

Albums produced by Sean Garrett
Hollywood Records albums
Jesse McCartney albums
Albums produced by Kuk Harrell
Unreleased albums